Shahbad is a village in Tijara Tehsil in Alwar District of Rajasthan State, India. It is located 52 km towards North from District headquarters Alwar. 5 km from Tijara. 174 km from State capital Jaipur

Villages in Alwar district